Simon Ssesazi (born 6 June 1996) is a Ugandan cricketer. In April 2018, he was named in Uganda's squad for the 2018 ICC World Cricket League Division Four tournament in Malaysia. He played in Uganda's opening match of the tournament, against Malaysia.

In July 2019, he was one of twenty-five players named in the Ugandan training squad, ahead of the Cricket World Cup Challenge League fixtures in Hong Kong.

In August 2021, he was named in Uganda's Twenty20 International (T20I) squad for the 2021–22 Uganda Tri-Nation Series. He made his T20I debut on 13 September 2021, for Uganda against Nigeria. In November 2021, he was named in Uganda's squad for the Regional Final of the 2021 ICC Men's T20 World Cup Africa Qualifier tournament in Rwanda. In May 2022, he was named in Uganda's side for the 2022 Uganda Cricket World Cup Challenge League B tournament. He made his List A debut on 17 June 2022, against Jersey.

References

External links
 

1996 births
Living people
Ugandan cricketers
Uganda Twenty20 International cricketers
Place of birth missing (living people)
20th-century Ugandan people
21st-century Ugandan people